Micklehurst Railway Station served the town of Mossley in Cheshire. It was built by the London and North Western Railway on its Micklehurst Line.  The station closed for passengers in 1907 and to freight on 19 February 1962 but the line through the station remained open for passenger traffic until 7 September 1964. The station building on the up (Diggle to Stalybridge) side are still standing and are used as a private residence.

References

The Manchester and Leeds Railway by Martin Bairstow

Disused railway stations in Tameside
Former London and North Western Railway stations
Railway stations in Great Britain opened in 1886
Railway stations in Great Britain closed in 1907